Elections to Liverpool City Council were held on Wednesday 1 November 1905.

There were three new seats: the first seat for Fazakerley, the third seat for Wavertree West and the second seat for Old Swan.

This election saw the first Socialist and Labour Councillors elected to the Council.

Eleven of the 35 seats were uncontested.

After the election, the composition of the council was:

Election result

Ward results

* - Retiring Councillor seeking re-election

Comparisons are made with the 1902 election results, as the retiring councillors were elected in that year.

Abercromby

Aigburth

Anfield

Breckfield

Brunswick

Castle Street

Dingle

Edge Hill

Everton

Exchange

Fairfield

Fazakerley

Garston

Granby

Great George

Kensington

Kirkdale

Low Hill

Netherfield

North Scotland

Old Swan

Prince's Park

Sandhills

St. Anne's

St. Domingo

St. Peter's

Sefton Park East

Sefton Park West

South Scotland

Vauxhall

Walton

Warbreck

Wavertree

Wavertree West

West Derby

Aldermanic Election, 13 June 1906

Caused by the resignation of Alderman William Edward Willink (Conservative, Wavertree West, elected 9 November 1903)

 was reported to the Council on 2 May 1906, in his place, Councillor Simon Jude (Conservative, Netherfield, elected 1 November 1903)

was elected as an alderman on 13 June 1906.

By-elections

No.18 Castle Street, 18 December 1905

Caused by the resignation of Councillor John Thomas Wood (Conservative, Castle Street, elected 2 November 1903) was reported to the Council on 6 December 1905

No.17 St. Anne's, 

Caused by the resignation of Councillor Isaac Caton Glover (Conservative, St. Anne's, elected 1 November 1904) which was reported to the Council on 7 February 1906

No.4 Fairfield, 19 April 1906

Caused by the resignation of Councillor Frank John Leslie (Conservative, Fairfield, elected 1 November 1905)
 which was reported to the Council on 4 April 1906.

No.25 Brunswick, 15 May 1906

Caused by the resignation of Councillor Thomas Byrne (Liberal, Brunswick, elected 1 November 1904) which was reported to the Council on 2 May 1906

No.8 Netherfied, 5 July 1906

Caused by Councillor Simon Jude (Conservative, Netherfield, elected 1 November 1903) being elected as an alderman on 13 June 1906

See also

 Liverpool City Council
 Liverpool Town Council elections 1835 - 1879
 Liverpool City Council elections 1880–present
 Mayors and Lord Mayors of Liverpool 1207 to present
 History of local government in England

References

1905
1905 English local elections
1900s in Liverpool